Besk (also known as Besg, Baiāq, Bāyak, Bāyg, and Bish Baik) is a village in Bayg Rural District, Bayg District, Torbat-e Heydarieh County, Razavi Khorasan Province, Iran. At the 2006 census, its population was 430, in 121 families.

See also 

 List of cities, towns and villages in Razavi Khorasan Province

References 

Populated places in Torbat-e Heydarieh County